Beyond That Mountain is a 2020 South Korean biographical film written and directed by Choi Jong-tae, starring Lee Kyung-hoon, Lee Hang-na, Ahn Nae-sang and Kang Shin-il. Based on the novel of the same name by Jung Chae-bong, it was released on April 30, 2020 on Buddha's Day.

Plot
Set in 1928, this film is about the childhood of Stephen Kim Sou-hwan, former Cardinal of the Roman Catholic Church and Archbishop of Seoul. He was an iconic figure in South Korea's bloody and tumultuous transition from military rule to democracy, and was widely respected across all sections in South Korean society.

Cast
 Lee Kyung-hoon as Stephen Kim Sou-hwan
 Lee Hang-na as Seo Jung-hwa
 Ahn Nae-sang as Kim Young-seok
 Kang Shin-il as Father Yoon
 Song Chang-eui as Kim Ik-hyun
 Lee Yul-eum as Kang Mal-son
 Jung Sang-hyun as Dong-han
 Lee Seul-bi as Sun-ja
 Kim Dong-hwa as Jin-goo
 Im Han-bin as Man-gil
 Baek Seung-ho as Yong-sik
 Yoon Seok-ho as Bong-pal
 Kim Young-jae as  Kim Dae-geon
 Woo Hyun as Pottery shop owner
 Kim Gi-cheon as Ginseng shop owner

Production
Child actor Lee Kyung-hoon was chosen among 260 candidates to portray Stephen Kim Sou-hwan.

References

External links
 
 

2020 films
2020s Korean-language films
2020 biographical drama films
South Korean biographical drama films
Films set in 1928
Films based on South Korean novels